Prince Philip, Duke of Edinburgh (1921–2021) was the husband of Queen Elizabeth II.

Prince Philip may also refer to:

Royalty
Philip I, Prince of Taranto (1278–1331)
Philip I of Piedmont (1278–1334), Prince of Achaea, Lord of Piedmont
Philip II, Prince of Taranto (1329–1374)
Philip, Prince of Anhalt-Köthen (1468–1500)
Philip, Prince of Portugal (1533–1539)
Philip de Lannoy, Prince of Sulmona (1544–1561)
Philip William, Prince of Orange (1554–1618)
Philip Joseph, Prince of Salm-Kyrburg (1709–1779)
Infante Felipe, Duke of Calabria (1747–1777)
Prince Philippe, Count of Flanders (1837–1905)
Philippe, comte de Paris (1838–1894)
Prince Philipp of Saxe-Coburg and Gotha (1844–1921)
Philipp, Prince of Eulenburg (1847–1921)
Prince Philip of Bourbon-Two Sicilies (1885–1949)
Philipp, Landgrave of Hesse (1896–1980)
Philippe of the Belgians (born 1960)
Felipe VI of Spain (born 1968)
Philipp, Prince of Hohenlohe-Langenburg (born 1970)
Philip, Hereditary Prince of Yugoslavia (born 1982)
Prince Philippos of Greece and Denmark (born 1986)

Pretenders
 Philip II of Piedmont (1340–1368), Count of Piedmont, Pretender Prince of Achaea

Fictional characters
Prince Phillip (Disney), a character in Sleeping Beauty

People with the nickname
Phillip Mitchell (born 1944), American R&B singer, songwriter, and record producer
Philip Smart (1960–2014), Jamaican-born music producer

See also
Philip (name), a given name and surname
King Philip (disambiguation)
Emperor Philip (disambiguation)
Philip (disambiguation)